The Roman Catholic Diocese of Bettiah is a diocese located in the city of Bettiah in the Ecclesiastical province of Patna in India.

Some of the communicants within this diocese are Bettiah Christians, one of the oldest ethnoreligious Christian communities in the northern Indian subcontinent. Newaris of the Catholic Christian faith who settled in Chuhari in the 1700s after being expelled from Nepal, are part of the Roman Catholic Diocese of Bettiah as well; they are known as Newar Christians. Other Catholic Christian communities who are served by the Roman Catholic Diocese of Betetiah include those of scheduled castes and tribal people.

History
 1892: Established as the Apostolic Prefecture of Bettiah from the Diocese of Allahabad
 1917: Suppressed to the Apostolic Vicariate of Patna
 June 27, 1998: Restored as Diocese of Bettiah from the Diocese of Muzaffarpur

Leadership
 Bishops of Bettiah (Latin Rite)
 Fr. Peter Sebastian Goveas, Vicar General of Bhagalpur Diocese, is elected new Bishop of the Catholic Diocese of Bettiah on 22 July 2017
 Bishop Victor Henry Thakur (June 27, 1998 – July 3, 2013); elevated to Archbishop of the Roman Catholic Archdiocese of Raipur, in Raipur, India, by Pope Francis
 Prefects Apostolic of Bettiah (Latin Rite) 
 Fr. Eugenio Remigio Schwarz, O.F.M. Cap. (1892 – 1918)

See also 

Christianity in Bihar

References

External links

 GCatholic.org 
 Catholic Hierarchy 

Roman Catholic dioceses in India
Religious organizations established in 1892
Roman Catholic dioceses and prelatures established in the 19th century
1892 establishments in India
Christianity in Bihar
West Champaran district